was a Japanese popular music and military music singer and composer. He took part in the Japan's famous year-end show Kōhaku Uta Gassen eleven times. One of well-known songs composed by him is the military song , which propaganda vehicles of uyoku dantai have aired in Japan.

Biography
Hayashi was born in Shimonoseki, Yamaguchi Prefecture, Japan. In 1931, he debuted with song . He signed with the King Records label in 1936.

Hayashi also composed Hachiro Kasuga's "Nagasaki no Onna" and Michiya Mihashi's "Ringo Mura Kara".

Hayashi served as the leader of the Japan Singers Association from 1989 to 1995.

Discography 
  : 1937
  : 1939
  : 1950
  : 1954
  : 1955

References 

1912 births
1995 deaths
20th-century Japanese composers
Japanese male composers
Musicians from Yamaguchi Prefecture
People from Shimonoseki
20th-century Japanese male singers
20th-century Japanese singers